Standard BioTools Inc. (formerly Fluidigm) is an American company engaged in the design, manufacture and sale of biological research equipment based on integrated fluidic circuit technology.  The company's founders leveraged their semiconductor experience to create integrated circuits that carried fluids rather than electrons.  In 2009, the company was described as "the world's leading manufacturer of microfluidic devices."  Among the applications to which the company's products are put to use are protein crystallization, genotyping, DNA analysis and PCR.

Business model
Its products leverage the capabilities of multilayer soft lithography to create microfluidic devices: specifically, technology developed by one of the co-founders and branded "Integrated Fluidic Circuitry".

It is a public company traded on the NASDAQ stock exchange, previously under the ticker symbol FLDM, and then under LAB.

Fluidigm has a number of academic partners whose engagement is aimed to provide a wow factor to exemplar product uses; partners include Wellcome Trust Sanger Institute, the Broad Institute, the Genome Institute of Singapore and Kyoto University.

Among companies which include "integrated microfluidic technology" into their products, the only competitor which a market focus on biotechnology as of 2011 appeared to be RainDance Technologies.

Going into 2015, the company is making an effort to infuse industrial design, aesthetic and customer centricity principles to help distinguish their products from those of competitors and generate a distinctive brand experience for users.

History
The company was founded in 1999 as "Mycometrix" by Stephen Quake and Gajus Worthington.  The company was formed to commercialize technology developed by Quake at the California Institute of Technology referred to as microfluidic large-scale integration and "branded" under the name Integrated Fluidic Circuits.  Richard DeLateur came on as chief financial officer in 2006; he was a 20-year veteran of Intel.  At the time, the company's chief executive officern (CEO) remained Gajus Worthington.  As of 2015, Worthington remained with the company as president and CEO, while Quake was a member of the company's scientific advisory board as of 2011.

The company completed a successful initial public offering (IPO) in February 2011, raising about $75 million.  This followed a failed, ill-timed IPO in 2008.  As of the 2011 IPO, Fluidigm had not yet become profitable, but had accumulated nearly $200 million in debt. Following a $250 million investment from Casdin Capital and Viking Global Investors in April 2022, Fluidigm changed its name to Standard BioTools.

Operations
At the end of 2014, Fluidigm had a headcount of 500 personnel.

In addition to its headquarters and laboratory facility in South San Francisco, California, which it expanded in 2014, the company in 2005 established the first biochip manufacturing facility in Singapore.  The Singapore facility was in 2009 led by Grace Yow, who also held the position of Fluidigm vice president of worldwide manufacturing.

Products
Fluidigm's products typically consist of single-use biochips, instrumentation for handling biochips and software for instrument operation and data collection and analysis.  No Fluidigm products had been approved for clinical use in the United States as of 2009.

Fluidigm's first commercial product was aimed at the protein crystallization market and was launched in 2003 under the brand "Topaz".  The company's second marketed product targeted high-throughput DNA amplification and was launched in 2006 under the brand "BioMark".  By 2013, BioMark had been adapted to real-time PCR and was capable of running >9000 reactions in parallel.  A high-throughput genotyping system, FLUIDIGM EPI, was introduced in 2008.

The C1 Single-Cell Auto Prep, or C1 system, was released in the early 2000s aimed at delivering 96 single-cell capture and processing events in parallel.  One aim of development forward from the C1 system is increasing parallel throughput.  This initial line of instruments purportedly cost about $200,000 apiece to purchase in 2011.  One reported use for the instruments is "to identify signatures of induced pluripotent stem cells".

In May 2021, Fluidigm introduced CyTOF XT, a forth-generation CyTOF platform that enables system-level biology at single-cell resolution, designed for clinical trials. CyTOF technology provides a high-resolution proteomic profile of each cell, which distinguishes it from all other cells and reveals the heterogeneity of the sample. Fluidigm also announced proteomics sample barcoding.

Notes

References

  Note: the book version viewed did not include the entire chapter cited here, only pages 225, 226 and 227.

External links

Research support companies
Technology companies based in the San Francisco Bay Area
Companies based in South San Francisco, California
American companies established in 1999
Technology companies established in 1999
1999 establishments in California
Companies listed on the Nasdaq